AC Landshut is a German automobile and motorcycle club best known for its motorcycle speedway team Landshut Devils, based in Landshut, Bavaria.

History
It was founded by ADAC members in 1922 and has won a record 12 German Bundesliga championships and a record 7 West German Championships (1973-1990). Since 1975 they have raced at the Ellermühle Speedway Stadium.

Due to the suspension of the German Speedway Bundesliga due to the COVID-19 pandemic in 2020, the club joined the Polish 1. Liga in 2021.

The club reached the play offs of 1.Liga during the 2022 Polish Speedway season and remained in the league for the 2023 season.

Teams

Current team
2023 squad
  Martin Smolinski
  Erik Riss 
  Kim Nilsson
  Kai Huckenbeck
  Dimitri Bergé
  Norick Blödorn 
  Sandro Wassermann 
  Timo Hildebrand
  Lukas Baumann
  Erik Bachhuber
  Maximilian Troidl
  Julian Bielmeier

Previous teams

2022 squad

  Erik Riss 
  Kai Huckenbeck
  Mario Niedermaier 
  Mads Hansen
  Dimitri Bergé
  Norick Blödorn 
  Erik Bachhuber 
  Kim Nilsson
  Valentin Grobauer

References

Speedway teams
Sports teams in Germany
Landshut